Oncidium harryanum is a species of orchid native to Colombia, Ecuador, and Peru. It is named in honour of Sir Harry Veitch (1840–1924), a horticulturist who sent collectors out for the firm of James Veitch & Sons.

References

harryanum
Flora of Colombia
Flora of Ecuador
Flora of Peru
Veitch Nurseries